Love Slaves of the Amazons is a 1957 American adventure film written, produced and directed by Curt Siodmak and starring Don Taylor, Gianna Segale and Eduardo Ciannelli.

Plot
An archaeologist (Don Taylor) and his partner (Eduardo Ciannelli) encounter a society of women warriors, who want to enslave men.

Cast
 Don Taylor as Dr. Peter Masters
 Gianna Segale as Gina Vanni
 Eduardo Ciannelli as Dr. Crespi
 Harvey Chalk as Aldemar Silva
 John Herbert as Hotel Clerk
 Wilson Vianna as Fernando (as Wilson Viana)
 Eugenio Carlos as Carlos - Fernando's brother
 Ana Maria Nabuco as Queen Conori
 Tom Payne as Dr. Mario Dellamano
 Gilda Nery as Amazon Guard
 Louis Serrano as Rescue Pilot

Production
The movie was filmed in Eastmancolor, in Argentina, in 1956, along with Curucu, Beast of the Amazon, and used some of the same cast. Curt Siodmak claimed to have made the film because he had 10,000 feet of color film left over from "Curucu" but could not export the unused film.

Reception
According to an online New York Times review, "You knew what you were in for when you saw the title, so don't grouse."

See also
 List of American films of 1957

References

External links 

 
 
 
 

1957 films
American adventure films
Films shot in Argentina
1957 adventure films
Films directed by Curt Siodmak
Universal Pictures films
1950s English-language films
1950s American films